Lompnieu is a former commune in the Ain department in eastern France. On 1 January 2019, it was merged into the new commune Valromey-sur-Séran.

It is located in La Val Romey, which means, "The Roman Valley." The Romans built several outposts in the valley.

Lompnieu is located near the base of the large valley, with forest mounting on one side, and a plain with larger mountains looming on the other side. On a clear day, the snow-covered Alps can be seen. Lompnieu is around 600 metres in elevation. The climate is rather hot in the summer, attaining into the 1990s, and fairly cold in winter, with several large snow falls.

Population

See also
Communes of the Ain department

References

Former communes of Ain
Ain communes articles needing translation from French Wikipedia
Populated places disestablished in 2019